The 2017 African Amateur Boxing Championships were held in Brazzaville, Republic of the Congo from 18 to 25 June 2017. It was the 19th edition of this event (and the first as a unified championships for men and women) organised by the African governing body for amateur boxing, the African Boxing Confederation (AFBC).

Medal summary

Men

Women

Medal table

References

External links
 Full match results at amateur-boxing.strefa.pl
 2017 AFBC African Confederation Boxing Championships at AIBA.org

2017
African Boxing Championships
Boxing
African Amateur Boxing Championships
21st century in the Republic of the Congo
Sport in the Republic of the Congo